Maniwaki Airport  is located  south of Maniwaki, Quebec, Canada. It is operated by Régie intermunicipale de l'aéroport Maniwaki.

See also
 Maniwaki/Blue Sea Lake Water Aerodrome

References

External links
Aéroport intermunicipal de Maniwaki - Ville de Maniwaki
Maniwaki airport - La Vallée-de-la-Gatineau Regional County Municipality

Registered aerodromes in Outaouais